Richard Ovenden  (born 25 March 1964) is a British librarian and author. He currently serves as Bodley's Librarian in the University of Oxford, having been appointed in 2014. Ovenden also serves as the Director of the Bodleian Library's Centre for the Study of the Book and holds a Professorial Fellowship at Balliol College. Ovenden is a trustee of the Chawton House Library and vice-chair of the Kraszna-Krausz Foundation. In 2009, he was elected chair of the Digital Preservation Coalition, replacing Dame Lynne Brindley in a post he held until 2013. He was elected to the American Philosophical Society in 2015. He is a Fellow of the Society of Antiquaries of London, having been elected in 2008.

Early life
Ovenden was educated at Deal Parochial and Sir Roger Manwood's School, Kent and at St Chad's College, Durham University, graduating in 1985.

Career
He has worked at Durham University Library, the House of Lords Library, the National Library of Scotland and at the University of Edinburgh, where he was responsible for Collection Management within the Library, for Special Collections and Archives, and for the University Museums and Art Gallery.

In 2003 he became Keeper of Special Collections and Western Manuscripts at the Bodleian Libraries and in 2011 was appointed Deputy Librarian.

Ovenden is the author of John Thomson (1837–1921): photographer (1997), a study of the Scottish photographer, and has also written Burning the Books (John Murray), which was shortlisted for the 2021 Wolfson History Prize.

He was appointed Officer of the Order of the British Empire (OBE) in the 2019 Birthday Honours for services to libraries and archives.

References

Further reading
Oxford Online. First Author. 24 August 2007. Interview with Ovenden about the Bodleian Library's digitisation programs and its partnerships with Google

1964 births
Alumni of St Chad's College, Durham
Bodley's Librarians
English librarians
Fellows of Balliol College, Oxford
Fellows of the Royal Society of Edinburgh
Fellows of the Society of Antiquaries of London
Living people
Members of the American Philosophical Society
Officers of the Order of the British Empire
People associated with the Bodleian Library
People educated at Sir Roger Manwood's School
People associated with the Oxford University Society of Bibliophiles